Ralf Schmitt (born January 21, 1977 in Speyer) is a German former footballer. He made his debut on the professional league level in the Bundesliga for Eintracht Frankfurt on April 14, 2001 when he came on as a substitute in the 87th minute in a game against 1. FC Kaiserslautern.

References

1977 births
Living people
German footballers
Eintracht Frankfurt players
Eintracht Frankfurt II players
Karlsruher SC players
Sportfreunde Siegen players
TSV 1860 Munich II players
Bundesliga players
2. Bundesliga players
FC Nöttingen players
FV Speyer players
Association football forwards
People from Speyer
Footballers from Rhineland-Palatinate